Plungė (Samogitian: Plongė) is a city in Lithuania with 17,252 inhabitants. Plungė is known for Plungė Manor and its park, Samogitian Art Museum. In the Oginskiai manor park stands the Perkūnas oak a natural monument. The Lourdes of Plungė was created in 1905 and attracts visitors to this day. In the center of Plungė stands a monument for the 10th anniversary of regaining the independence of Lithuania and a sculpture of Saint Florian built by the Lithuanian book carrier Kazys Barzdys.

It has a crab stick factory which exports to many countries in Europe.

History 

It is thought that the territory in which Plungė is situated was inhabited in 5th–1st centuries BC. After the Treaty of Melno country seats were established in the forests of Samogitia. From the 14th century to the middle of the 16th century, Plungė was a part of Gandinga district as an ordinary settlement. Later, the population of Plungė started to grow faster and surpassed the population of Gandinga. In 1567 Plungė was mentioned as a town.

On January 13, 1792, Plungė was granted Magdeburg rights. From 1806 to 1873 Plungė belonged to Platon Zubov, and later – to Oginskiai, who built a palace here in 1879.

During the interwar period there was established gymnasium in 1925 and built railway branch-line in 1932. In 1933 current Catholic Church was consecrated. Since the private hospital was founded in 1939, maternity, surgical sections started their activities. Lithuanian Jews were active in the town's government and comprised around half of Plungė's inhabitants leading up to The Holocaust in Lithuania.

During the 1941 June Uprising in Lithuania and the German invasion as part of Operation Barbarossa, Plungė was captured by German forces on 25 June 1941. Lithuanian nationalists, led by Jonas Noreika, seized control and formed a town administration and police force. German forces killed 60 young Jewish men, accused by the Lithuanians of being a rear guard for the Red Army, shortly after the town's capture. On 26 June 1941, the day after the Germans' arrival in Plungė, Lithuanian forces moved the town's Jews into a makeshift ghetto, while carrying out beatings, torture, murders and forcing Jews to perform heavy labor. On 13 or 15 July in the Plungė massacre, the Lithuanian nationalists transported Jewish men, women and children to ditches near the village of Kausenai where they were shot. Of the 1,700 Jews living in Plungė in 1939, very few survived and often those who were victims of the Soviet deportations from Lithuania prior to the Holocaust. Remembrance sites for the events of 1941 exist in and around the town. The Jewish holocaust survivor and sculptor Jacob Bunka was one of the town's few Jews to survive the war.

During the years of the independence of Lithuania Plungė's economic was based on the factory of fibre flax and cotton Kučiskis – Pabedinskiai and also on the activities of Jewish businessmen and agricultural products made by Samogitian farmers.

After World War II and the Soviet occupation, Plungė started to grow rapidly – if the city had 7,400 inhabitants in 1950, in 1990 it had already had 23,300 inhabitants. During the years of Soviet occupation, Lithuanians became the majority of city's inhabitants. According to Government's Resolution of 1963, Plungė should have become regional centre with a strong industry. However these plans were ruined when it became obvious that the city doesn't have enough water resources although some high level companies representing various branches of industry were established in Plungė. Most of these companies however bankrupted after the Independence of Lithuania was announced.

The coat of arms of Plungė was affirmed by the decree of the President on June 6, 1997. In 2009 Plungė was elected Lithuanian Capital of Culture. Nowadays Plungė is the sixteenth largest city of Lithuania having 22,287 inhabitants.

Name
Origin of the name Plungė is not clear enough. The most persuasive theory is that the name of the city is issued from the name of river Paplunga which flowed through the city.

The city's name is Płungiany in Polish, Plongė in Samogitian, Plungyan (פלונגיאן) in Yiddish.  It was also called Плунгяны (Plungyany) in Russian in the past.

Main sights 
 Plungė Manor
 Plungė District Municipal Public Library
 Plungė park
 St. John the Baptist Church
 St. Florian's sculpture
 Plokštinė missile base (Cold War Museum) near the city

Transport

Important highways are built near the city:
Highway A11 Šiauliai–Palanga
Highway 164 Mažeikiai–Plungė–Tauragė
Highway 166 Plungė–Vėžaičiai

Plungė also has railway station. Trains going by the route Vilnius–Klaipėda and Radviliškis–Klaipėda stop there.

Sports
Football club "FK Babrungas Plungė" plays in Lithuanian Football Federation's 2 League's Western Zone. Team plays in the Central Stadium of Plungė.

Basketball club "Olimpas Plungė" plays in National Basketball League. The team was established in 1989. In 1997, BC Olimpas played in the Lithuanian Basketball League finals, where they lost to BC Žalgiris Kaunas. Afterwards, the team didn't appear in national competitions until 2011. Olimpas Plungė started to play in Regional Basketball League and won gold medals in 2012 and qualified to National Basketball League. In 2012-2013 National Basketball League's regular season team finished 3rd amongst 18 teams, however it lost the Quarter-finals series 2-0 to BC Žalgiris Kaunas 2.  Team plays in "SS Žemaitijos Suvenyras" arena, which has a capacity of 200 people.

Twin towns – sister cities

Plungė is twinned with:

 Bjerkreim, Norway
 Boxholm, Sweden
 Bruntál, Czech Republic
 Golub-Dobrzyń, Poland
 Kvareli, Georgia
 Menden, Germany
 Tukums, Latvia

Famous residents 
   
 Chaim Yitzchak Bloch Hacohen was born here and later served as Rosh Yeshivah.
 Jacob Bunka, folk artist and creator of Holocaust memorials.
 M. K. Čiurlionis (1875–1911), Lithuanian composer and artist, lived here
 Lazarus Goldschmidt (Plungė, 1871–1950), translator of the Talmud
 Historian Zenonas Ivinskis (Plungė, 1908–1971) was born here
 Jurgita Jurkutė (Plungė, 1985), Miss Lithuania 2007, was born here
 Bronislovas Lubys (1938–2011), entrepreneur, former Prime Minister of Lithuania, signatory of the Act of the Re-Establishment of the State of Lithuania, and businessman
 , former Lithuanian ambassador to the United Kingdom.
 Wanda Rutkiewicz (1943–1992), a mountaineer, the first European woman to reach the summit of Mount Everest and the first female climber to reach K2
 Aistė Smilgevičiūtė (Plungė, 1977), singer, was born here
 Petras Vyšniauskas,  Jazz saxophonist, was born and grew up here

References

External links
 
 The murder of the Jews of Plungė during World War II, at Yad Vashem website.

 
Cities in Telšiai County
Cities in Lithuania
Municipalities administrative centres of Lithuania
Plungė District Municipality
Telshevsky Uyezd
Holocaust locations in Lithuania